Vasiliki (Vasilikí; formerly Voivoida (Βοϊβόδα, Voïvóda) is a town in the municipal unit of Apollonioi, on the island of Lefkada, Greece. It is situated on the south coast, 4 km south of Agios Petros and 25 km southwest of Lefkada (city).

Vasiliki is a well known windsurfing spot during the summer months due to a local thermal wind known amongst windsurfers as 'Eric'. There are often over a hundred windsurfers in the bay at any one time. The area is also popular with other sailing craft and mountain bikers. Several holiday companies operate in Vasiliki providing windsurfing and sailing equipment for their guests to use.

Population

See also
List of settlements in the Lefkada regional unit

References

External links
Vasiliki on GTP Travel Pages (in English and Greek)
Vassiliki Tourism and Holidays
Vasiliki Destination

Populated places in Lefkada (regional unit)